Steve Scott (born May 5, 1956) is an American former track athlete and one of the greatest mile runners in American history. The silver medalist in the 1500 meters at the inaugural IAAF World Championships in Athletics in Helsinki in 1983, Scott owns the U.S. indoor record in the 2000 meters (4:58.6-1981). He held the American outdoor mile record for more than 26 years and also is the former American indoor record holder in the same event. Track & Field News ranked Scott #1 in the U.S. on 10 occasions, and 11 times during his career he was ranked in the top ten in the world by T&FN. Additionally, he participated for the US team at the 1984 Olympics. He finished 5th in the 1500 meter run at the 1988 Olympics held in Korea. Scott was also an Olympian on the 1980 Olympics team which was not allowed to go to Moscow. He ran the sub four-minute mile on 136 occasions in his career, more than any other runner in history.

Scott is also regarded as the founder of speed golf in 1979;  on December 2, 1982, Scott set a record for the fastest round of golf played on a regulation course, completing 18 holes in 29 minutes, 33.05 seconds at Miller Golf Course in Anaheim, Calif. Using only two clubs and running from hole to hole, he posted a respectable score of 95.

Early years
Scott grew up in the 1960s in Upland, California. His mother was a runner who preceded the running boom. His father was an overweight physician who smoked and did not see the value of running. Through his mother's influence and a coach's persistence, Scott ran on Upland's cross country team. The persistent coach was Robert Loney, cross country coach and math instructor at Upland High School. Steve caught track fever watching the 1972 Olympics on television, as U.S. runner Dave Wottle won the gold medal in the 800 meters. Wottle is often remembered for running the Olympic final in a golf cap, which he forgot to take off during the medal ceremony while the national anthem played. Wottle's cap inspired Scott, so he wore a cap in every race of the 1972 cross country season. In his junior year in high school, Scott made the varsity squad as the fifth runner. In track, he concentrated on the shorter distances and ran the 800 in 1:58 and the mile in 4:30. He also met Kim Votaw, a freshman runner who would eventually become his wife in 1979.  The couple was divorced in 1994.

In his senior year, Scott became the top runner on the cross country team and improved his track times to 1:52 in the 800 and 4:15 in the mile. He finished fourth in the CIF California State Meet in the 880 yards and drew several college scholarship offers. He liked coach Len Miller and joined him at the University of California, Irvine in the fall of 1974. He still holds the UCI school record in the 1500, and the UC Irvine Steve Scott Invitational is named after him. While at UCI, Scott won the 1977 NCAA Men's Outdoor Track and Field Championships Division-I 1500-meter title after winning the 1500 twice and the mile once at three previous NCAA Division-II meets.

Scott ran his first sub-4:00 mile indoors at the Sunkist Invitational in Los Angeles in January 1977, his junior year in college. The following year, he blossomed from an unknown college runner to an international miler, competing on both sides of the Atlantic.  When he graduated with a degree in social ecology in 1978, Scott had already run 11 sub-4:00 miles.

International running career
When Sebastian Coe set a mile record of 3:48.95 in Oslo on July 17, 1979, Scott finished second with a time of 3:51.11. Because records at the time were rounded up to the nearest tenth of a second, Scott missed tying Jim Ryun's American mile record of 3:51.1 by 1/100th of a second. However, in 1981, the IAAF started to recognize records in running events longer than 400 meters to the hundredth of a second, meaning that Scott's 3:51.11 had tied Ryun's record, depending on how the times were interpreted.

Scott won the 1500 m at the 1980 U.S. Olympic Trials but did not compete at the Moscow Games due to the U.S. boycott. He received one of 461 Congressional Gold Medals created especially for the spurned athletes, and won the 1500 m at the Liberty Bell Classic organised for athletes from boycotting nations. His greatest success at an Olympic or World championship came at the inaugural World Athletics Championships in Helsinki, Finland in 1983, when he won a silver medal behind Steve Cram. At the 1984 Olympic Games in Los Angeles and the 1988 Games in Seoul, he placed 10th and 5th in the 1500 m respectively.

Perhaps his greatest legacy was setting three American mile records. While there was uncertainty whether his 3:51.11 was at least equal to the American mile record or not, his first undisputed American record came when he ran third in another Oslo race on July 11, 1981 with a time of 3:49.68, becoming the first American to break 3:50 in the event and the fifth ever to do so. South African Sydney Maree, who was in the process of gaining his American citizenship, ran 3:48.83 on September 9, 1981, though this time was not generally seen as being an American record.

The following year Scott broke the American mile record twice, both times again at Oslo. First, he won a race on June 26, 1982 in 3:48.53, becoming history's third-fastest miler behind Coe and Steve Ovett; then 11 days later he ran 3:47.69, the second-fastest mile in history. That time would stand as the American record for a quarter century until Alan Webb ran 3:46.91 in 2007.

He was the 1500 m bronze medalist at the 1987 Pan American Games.

Scott loved to race—indoors, outdoors, on the roads, and in cross country—sometimes as many as 50 competitions a year.  This included three top ten finishes in the U.S. National Cross Country Championships (7th in 1979, 4th in 1980, and 6th in 1981) as well as three victories in the Carlsbad 5000 road race from 1986 to 1988.  His times at Carlsbad in 1986 (13:32) and 1988 (13:30) were World Best times for a road 5K.  Among his fellow middle-distance runners, he was known as one of track & field's fiercest competitors. During the decade that followed his first sub-4-minute mile, Scott lived out of a suitcase. He traveled the world and competed year-round in the United States, Canada, Jamaica, Germany, Sweden, Norway, England, France, Switzerland, Belgium, Ireland, Greece, Australia and New Zealand.

In the closing stages of a career that saw Scott race at the highest levels for nearly two decades, his attempt to run a sub-4:00 mile at age-40 in 1996  was derailed by a battle with testicular cancer.

California State University San Marcos Coach
He was cured of testicular cancer and since retiring from competition he has built one of the most successful NAIA collegiate programs in the country as Head Coach of Track and Cross Country at Cal State San Marcos. At San Marcos he has led the women's team to 3 National Titles from 2009-2011, and in 2011 the men's team placed 2nd. He later received an OBE for his services to sport. In 2002, he was inducted into the USA Track and Field Hall of Fame. Scott has two sons, Corey and Shawn, and a daughter, Megan. He and his wife JoAnn live in Lake Kiowa, Texas.

Personal bests

Book 
 Steve Scott & Marc Bloom, Steve Scott the Miler Macmillan (1997)

References

External links 
 
 USA Track and Field Hall of Fame

Video Interviews 
 Flotrack Videos of Steve Scott

1956 births
Living people
People from Upland, California
Sportspeople from San Bernardino County, California
Track and field athletes from California
American male middle-distance runners
Olympic track and field athletes of the United States
Athletes (track and field) at the 1984 Summer Olympics
Athletes (track and field) at the 1988 Summer Olympics
Pan American Games track and field athletes for the United States
Pan American Games medalists in athletics (track and field)
Athletes (track and field) at the 1987 Pan American Games
World Athletics Championships athletes for the United States
World Athletics Championships medalists
UC Irvine Anteaters athletes
Pan American Games bronze medalists for the United States
Congressional Gold Medal recipients
Goodwill Games medalists in athletics
Competitors at the 1986 Goodwill Games
Medalists at the 1987 Pan American Games